Centrolepis alepyroides is a species of plant in the Restionaceae family and is found in Western Australia.

It blooms between September and November.

It is found among granite outcrops and in beds of moss in the Wheatbelt, South West and Great Southern regions of Western Australia where it grows in damp sandy soils.

References

alepyroides
Plants described in 1849
Flora of Western Australia
Poales of Australia